The 1991–92 Marquette Warriors men's basketball team represented Marquette University during the 1991–92 men's college basketball season.

Roster

Schedule

External links
MUScoop's MUWiki

References 

Marquette Golden Eagles men's basketball seasons
Marquette
Marquette
Marquette